Aim I is an outdoor 1980 aluminum sculpture by Alexander Liberman, installed at the San Diego Museum of Art's May S. Marcy Sculpture Garden, in the U.S. state of California.

See also

 1980 in art

References

External links
 

1980 sculptures
Aluminum sculptures in California
Outdoor sculptures in San Diego
Sculptures of the San Diego Museum of Art
Sculptures by Alexander Liberman